Akito is a masculine Japanese given name. Notable people with the name include:

 (1930–2020), Japanese nuclear physicist
 (born 1987), Japanese footballer
 (born 1987), Japanese professional wrestler
 (born 1988), Japanese footballer
 (born 1988), Japanese Nordic combined skier
 (born 1989), Japanese singer
 (born 1992), Japanese footballer
 (born 1993), Japanese singer

Fictional characters:
Akito Tenkawa, main character of the anime series Martian Successor Nadesico
Akito Shinonome, a character in the video game Hatsune Miku: Colorful Stage!
Akito Sohma, leader of the Sohma clan in the manga and anime Fruits Basket
Akito Hayama, main character in Kodomo no Omocha
Akito Takagi, main character in Bakuman
Akito Wanijima, character in the manga and anime Air Gear
Akito Himenokōji, main character in the light novel and anime series OniAi
Hiyama Akito, character in the manga, “ICE MOUNTAIN”
Akito Hyuga, character from Code Geass: Akito the Exiled

See also
Akito, a tonearm manufactured by the music system producer Linn Products

Japanese masculine given names